Amphithalassius is a genus of flies in the family Dolichopodidae. It is found along sandy sea coasts in South Africa. It contains two described species, and three undescribed species known only from females. It is closely related to Plesiothalassius.

Species
 Amphithalassius latus Ulrich, 1991
 Amphithalassius piricornis Ulrich, 1991

References

Dolichopodidae genera
Parathalassiinae
Diptera of Africa
Endemic insects of South Africa